The acts of the 107th United States Congress includes all Acts of Congress and ratified treaties by the 107th United States Congress, which lasted from January 3, 2001, to January 3, 2003,

Acts include public and private laws, which are enacted after being passed by Congress and signed by the President, however if the President vetoes a bill it can still be enacted by a two-thirds vote in both houses. The Senate alone considers treaties, which are ratified by a two-thirds vote.

Summary of actions
President George W. Bush did not veto any bills during this Congress.

Public laws

Private laws

Treaties
No treaties have been enacted this Congress.

See also
 List of United States federal legislation
 List of acts of the 106th United States Congress
 List of acts of the 108th United States Congress

References

External links

 Authenticated Public and Private Laws from the Federal Digital System
 Legislation & Records Home: Treaties from the Senate
 Public Laws for the 107th Congress at Congress.gov
 Private Laws for the 107th Congress at Congress.gov

 
107